Love, Texas, is the name of two unincorporated communities:

 Love, Cass County, Texas
 Love, Swisher County, Texas